Franz Rybicki (12 August 1924 – 25 September 2014) was an association football player and manager from Austria. He played for Rapid Vienna, First Vienna and Kapfenberger SV. He coached FC Stadlau, Ethnikos Piraeus, DFC, IJ.V.V. Stormvogels, BVV, AGOVV

References

External links
 Profile 

1924 births
2014 deaths
Austrian footballers
Austrian football managers
Austrian expatriate football managers
SK Rapid Wien players
First Vienna FC players
Kapfenberger SV players
FC Dordrecht managers
AGOVV Apeldoorn managers
Expatriate football managers in Greece
Austrian expatriate sportspeople in Greece
Expatriate football managers in the Netherlands
Austrian expatriate sportspeople in the Netherlands
Place of birth missing
Association football defenders
Austrian people of Slavic descent